Paul Codman Cabot (October 21, 1898 – September 1, 1994) was an American businessman. He served as chief executive and chairman of the State Street Investment Corporation. He was also treasurer of Harvard University.

Early life
A Boston Brahmin and a member of the Cabot family, Cabot was born in Brookline, Massachusetts.  His father, Henry Bromfield Cabot, was a lawyer and investor. His brother was Charles Codman Cabot.

Cabot was educated at Harvard College and then Harvard Business School from which he graduated cum laude.

Career
In 1924, he formed the State Street Investment Corporation. which was the second open-end mutual fund legally incorporated but the first to operate.  He was one of the first practitioners of fundamental equity research including on-site management interviews and also among the first to favor the price-earnings ratio in his valuation work over dividend yield.  These innovations contributed to outstanding investment performance for decades.  During the 1920s he uncovered the unethical practices of certain other funds.  Due to the fame this gained him he was able to influence important New Deal securities legislation such as the Revenue Act of 1936 and the Investment Company Act of 1940.<ref>"Passion for Reality: The Extraordinary Life of the Investing Pioneer Paul Cabot by Michael R. Yogg (2014)</ref>

He was treasurer of Harvard University between 1948 and 1965, during which period the university's endowment grew from $177 million to over $1 billion.

He retired as chief executive of State Street in 1958, although he retained his position as chairman.

Personal life
In September 1924, Cabot was married to Virginia Converse, a daughter of Frederick S. Converse, a prominent American composer. Together, they had five children.

He died on September 1, 1994 at Deaconess-Glover Hospital in Needham.

Further reading
 Passion for Reality: The Extraordinary Life of the Investing Pioneer Paul Cabot'' by Michael R. Yogg (2014)

References

People from Needham, Massachusetts
American treasurers
1898 births
1994 deaths
Harvard College alumni
Harvard University administrators
People from Brookline, Massachusetts
Harvard Business School alumni
Cabot family
American chief executives of financial services companies
20th-century American politicians